Schedule 3 substances, in the sense of the Chemical Weapons Convention, are chemicals which can either be used as toxic chemical weapons themselves or used in the manufacture of chemical weapons but which also have legitimate large-scale industrial uses.

Plants which manufacture more than 30 tonnes per year must be declared and can be inspected as per Part VIII of the "Verification Annex", and there are restrictions on export to countries which are not CWC signatories.  Examples of these substances are phosgene, which has been used as a chemical weapon but which is also a precursor in the manufacture of many legitimate organic compounds, and triethanolamine, used in the manufacture of nitrogen mustard but also commonly used in toiletries and detergents.

As with the other schedules, they are sub-divided into Part A substances, which are chemicals that can be used directly as weapons, and Part B which are precursors useful in the manufacture of chemical weapons.

The Schedule 3 list is one of three lists. Chemicals which can be used as weapons, or used in their manufacture, but which have no, or almost no, legitimate applications as well are listed in Schedule 1, whilst Schedule 2 is used for chemicals which have legitimate small-scale applications.

Guidelines for Schedule 3 

The criteria for including a chemical in this schedule is that it is not listed in either of the other two, and:
It has been produced, stockpiled or used as a chemical weapon;
It poses otherwise a risk to the object and purpose of this Convention because it possesses such lethal or incapacitating toxicity as well as other properties that might enable it to be used as a chemical weapon;
It poses a risk to the object and purpose of this Convention by virtue of its importance in the production of one or more chemicals listed in Schedule 1 or Schedule 2, part B;
It may be produced in large commercial quantities for purposes not prohibited under this Convention.

Toxic chemicals 
	  	 
Phosgene: Carbonyl dichloride
Cyanogen chloride 
Hydrogen cyanide
Chloropicrin: Trichloronitromethane

Precursors 	 
  	  	 
Phosphorus oxychloride
Phosphorus trichloride 
Phosphorus pentachloride 
Trimethyl phosphite
Triethyl phosphite	
Dimethyl phosphite
Diethyl phosphite
Sulfur monochloride
Sulfur dichloride
Thionyl chloride
Ethyl diethanolamine
Methyl diethanolamine
Triethanolamine
Pinacolone

See also 
Dual-use technology

External links
 Chemical Weapons Convention. Annex on Chemicals. A. Guidelines for Schedules of Chemicals // Organisation for the Prohibition of Chemical Weapons
 Chemical Weapons Convention. Annex on Chemicals. B. Schedules of Chemicals. Schedule 3 // Organisation for the Prohibition of Chemical Weapons

Chemical weapons demilitarization
Lists of weapons
Schedule 3 substances (CWC)